Kashmir is a Danish alternative rock band consisting of Kasper Eistrup (vocals and lead guitar); Mads Tunebjerg (bass); Asger Techau (drums) and Henrik Lindstrand (keyboards and guitar).

History
In the spring of 1991, Eistrup, Tunebjerg and Techau formed a heavy blues band under the name "Nirvana" at Kastanievej Efterskole, a continuation school, in Frederiksberg, Denmark. Shortly after they started performing Thursday nights at Ordrup Gymnasium, a local high school.

When the American band Nirvana started to gain success, they changed their name to "Kashmir", after the Led Zeppelin song.

In 1993, they finished second in "DM i Rock", a national amateur concert contest, behind Dizzy Mizz Lizzy and subsequently became popular in Denmark.

In 2000, the band won six Danish Music Awards: 'Best Danish Band', 'Best Danish Album', 'Best Danish Songwriter', and 'Best Danish Rock Album' for The Good Life; and 'Best Danish Producer' and 'Best Danish Music Video' for "Mom in Love, Daddy in Space".

In 2001, Lindstrand joined the band's lineup.

In 2004, the band won four Danish Music Awards for 'Best Danish Band', 'Best Danish Rock Album' for Zitilites, 'Best Danish Music Video' for "Rocket Brothers" and 'Best Album Cover' for Zitilites.

Their album No Balance Palace (2005), features Lou Reed reciting a poem by Eistrup on "Black Building" and David Bowie who sings a duet with Eistrup on "The Cynic". Additionally, the album was produced by Tony Visconti.

On 13 November 2009, Kashmir released the first single "Mouthful of Wasps" on their website. The band also announced via Twitter that Trespassers, their sixth full-length album, would see its release on 1 February 2010. Trespassers was produced by John O'Mahony and Andy Wallace, and recorded at Jimi Hendrix's Electric Lady Studios in New York City.

In 2017, the band went on indefinite hiatus.

In 2022, the band started a new tour. The tour was planned for 2022, but was postponed due to Corona.

Discography

Albums

Notes
  - Cruzential was re-released in 1997 with two extra songs as Cruzential (Luxury Version 1997).

Live

Mini-albums & EPs

Singles

Notes
  - Danish Single Chart peak positions for "Mom in Love, Daddy in Space" and "Rocket Brothers" are for the 2010 chart entries.

DVDs 
 Rocket Brothers (2004)
 The Aftermath (2005) - A live concert DVD/CD from Store Vega, Copenhagen. 2–3 November 2004.
 E.A.R (2013) - Special Mexican Edition DVD with the making of the album E.A.R and music videos.

References

https://gaffa.dk/nyhed/115328/kashmir-oploser-firmaet-bag-bandet

External links
 
 

Danish rock music groups
Danish alternative rock groups